Porsgrunds Blad was a Norwegian newspaper, published in Porsgrunn in Telemark county first established on the 1 May 1846 as Ugeblad for Porsgrund og Omegn, initially apolitical, it became conservative-leaning, facing competition from the more clear-cut conservative newspaper, Grenmar. After a short time Porsgrunds Blad tried a liberal agenda, it went defunct in 1886 and was absorbed by Grenmar. Its last issue was printed on 31 March 1886.

History
Ugeblad for Porsgrund og Omegn was started as a weekly newspaper on 1 May 1846. It struggled economically, and was auctioned in late 1848. From 4 January 1849 its name was Posttidende ("Postal Times"), from 1858 Porsgrunds Blad.

Demise
It was first apolitical, then conservative-leaning, but from 1878 it faced competition from a more clear-cut conservative newspaper, Grenmar. After a short time when Porsgrunds Blad tried a liberal agenda, it went defunct in 1886 and was absorbed by Grenmar. Its last issue came on 31 March 1886.

References

1846 establishments in Norway
Defunct newspapers published in Norway
Liberal Party (Norway) newspapers
Norwegian-language newspapers
Porsgrunn
Publications established in 1846
Publications disestablished in 1886
Mass media in Telemark
1886 disestablishments in Norway